Karen Nelson (born 3 December 1963) is a Canadian former hurdler. She competed in the women's 100 metres hurdles at the 1984 Summer Olympics.

References

External links
 
 

1963 births
Living people
Athletes (track and field) at the 1984 Summer Olympics
Athletes (track and field) at the 1983 Pan American Games
Athletes (track and field) at the 1987 Pan American Games
Athletes (track and field) at the 1982 Commonwealth Games
Athletes (track and field) at the 1990 Commonwealth Games
Canadian female hurdlers
Olympic track and field athletes of Canada
Pan American Games bronze medalists for Canada
Pan American Games medalists in athletics (track and field)
Commonwealth Games competitors for Canada
World Athletics Championships athletes for Canada
Jamaican emigrants to Canada
People from Saint Andrew Parish, Jamaica
Black Canadian female track and field athletes
Medalists at the 1983 Pan American Games